Bad Reputation may refer to:

Music

Albums 
 Bad Reputation (Dirty White Boy album), or the title song, 1990
 Bad Reputation (Joan Jett album), or the title song (see below), 1980
 Bad Reputation (Kid Rock album), 2022
 Bad Reputation (Thin Lizzy album), or the title song (see below), 1977
 Bad Reputation (David Wilcox album), or the title song, 1984
 Bad Reputation, by The Ritchie Family, 1979

Songs 
 "Bad Reputation" (Adelitas Way song), 2016
 "Bad Reputation" (Joan Jett song), 1980, also covered by Avril Lavigne
 "Bad Reputation" (Freedy Johnston song), 1994
 "Bad Reputation" (Thin Lizzy song), 1977
 "Bad Reputation", by Avicii from Tim, 2019
 "Bad Reputation", by Damn Yankees from Damn Yankees
 "Bad Reputation", by The dB's from Stands for Decibels
 "Bad Reputation", by Kelly Clarkson from Piece by Piece
 "Bad Reputation", by Shawn Mendes from Illuminate
 "Bad Reputation", by Vixen from Rev It Up

Film, television and theatre 
 Bad Reputation (2005 film), an American horror film
 Bad Reputation (2018 film), a 2018 American film about the rock musician Joan Jett
 "Bad Reputation" (Glee), a 2010 episode of Glee
 "Bad Reputation", an episode of Holby City
 Bad Reputation, a performance piece by Penny Arcade

See also 
 Reputation, an evaluation or opinion of one's social standing or character
 Reputation (disambiguation)